A flanking line is an area of cumulus congestus or small cumulonimbus that mark an area of widespread updrafts on the edge of strong thunderstorms. These flanking lines generally occur in the vicinity of supercell thunderstorms or large multicell thunderstorms.

Structure of a flanking line 

A flanking line often has a stairstep appearance where the tallest cells are connected to the main cumulonimbus.

The bases of the clouds making the flanking line are merged. The forefront area usually has no precipitation. In the picture, it is possible to detect precipitation in the background just above the horizon below the main cloud.

Formation of the flanking line 

The flanking line is generated by the downburst that builds a cold air wedge beneath the warmer airmass in front of the thunderstorm. This warm air is forced upward and generates cumuliform clouds when the air column becomes saturated.
These feeder clouds will merge with the main cumulonimbus and will regenerate the storm. These new feeder clouds are located, in the northern hemisphere, at the west or southwest of the main cloud.

Since these updrafts do not originate from the ground, the lifted condensation level will be higher than the convective condensation level associated with the main cumulonimbus. The cloud base of the flanking line is higher than the main cloud base.  When the difference between these two levels increases, it indicates that the downburst has become stronger and thus that the severity of the thunderstorm has increased.

Soaring 

A widespread misconception in the world of soaring is that the updrafts associated with an incoming thunderstorm are almost always very strong and turbulent,
which is most of the time incorrect. If one believes this myth, then he would consider it safe (from thunderstorms, at least) to fly in an area with plentiful weak to moderate updrafts, since the updrafts associated with thunderstorms are always supposed to be strong and turbulent.

In fact, the turbulence zone is located in and at the vicinity of the downdraft. The updrafts under the flanking line are smooth. The refutation of this myth is poetically expressed by Dominique Musto who says the following:

The author means that when flying under a flanking line, the updrafts will be widespread and smooth. Since the cells making the flanking line will fuse with the main cell, the soaring conditions will "improve", the updrafts will become stronger and stronger and the cloud base will become darker and darker.

Another clue of imminent danger is that the cloud base is significantly higher than the theoretical cloud base based on the difference between the temperature and dew point on the ground. Eventually, the pilot may inadvertently fly under the main cell. If the pilot ignores these harbingers, he may hit a tornado generated under a wall cloud and disintegrate his fragile skiff.

Notwithstanding the aforementioned, Dennis Pagen experimented the exploitation of a flanking line (that he calls a bench) with a hang glider along a severe thunderstorm. This flight was performed during the preliminaries of the 1990 hang glider world championship in Brazil. The author admits that this achievement was dubious.

References

See also 
 Cumulonimbus
 Cumulonimbus and aviation

Aeronautics
Clouds
Gliding technology
Severe weather and convection